The Hex are a professional wrestling tag team currently signed to Impact Wrestling consisting of Allysin Kay and Marti Belle. They are former one-time NWA World Women's Tag Team Champions.

History

National Wrestling Alliance
In August 2021, National Wrestling Alliance announced the Allysin Kay and Marti Belle would be returning, going by the team name the Hex, to participate at NWA EmPowerrr, on August 28, in a tournament to crown the new NWA World Women's Tag Team Champions. At the event, the Hex defeated Red Velvet & KiLynn King in a tournament final to win the revived titles.

On October 24, 2021, at NWA By Any Means Necessary, the Hex successfully defended the championships against Thunder Kitty & Tootie Lynn.

On June 11, 2022, at Alwayz Ready, The Hex unsuccessfully defended the NWA World Women's Tag Team Championships against Pretty Empowered (Ella Envy and Kenzie Paige).

Ring of Honor
On October 27, 2021, The Hex made their Ring of Honor debut as a team successfully defending the NWA World Women's Tag Team Championships against The Allüre (Angelina Love & Mandy Leon). On December 11, The Hex teamed with Chelsea Green at Final Battle losing to the team of Miranda Alize and The Allüre (Angelina Love & Mandy Leon).

Impact Wrestling
On January 20, 2023, The Hex accompanied by Father James Mitchell made their Impact Wrestling debut attacking Rosemary and Taya Valkyrie.

Championships and accomplishments
National Wrestling Alliance
NWA World Women's Tag Team Championship (1 time)
NWA World Women's Tag Team Championship Tournament (2021)
Pro-Wrestling: EVE
Pro-Wrestling: EVE Tag Team Championship (1 time)
Shine Wrestling
Shine Tag Team Championship (1 time)

References

Ring of Honor teams and stables
National Wrestling Alliance teams and stables
Impact Wrestling teams and stables
Independent promotions teams and stables
Women's wrestling teams and stables